Eric Scott may refer to:

 Eric Scott (actor) (born 1958), American actor
 Eric R. Scott, Canadian filmmaker
 Eric Oswald Gale Scott (1899-1986), Australian zoologist, teacher and pacifist

See also
Erick Scott (born 1981), Costa Rican footballer